Jan Kawulok (27 January 1946 – 23 November 2021) was a Polish skier. He competed in the Nordic combined event at the 1968 Winter Olympics. He died on 23 November 2021, at the age of 75.

References

External links
 

1946 births
2021 deaths
Polish male Nordic combined skiers
Olympic Nordic combined skiers of Poland
Nordic combined skiers at the 1968 Winter Olympics
People from Wisła
Polish male ski jumpers
20th-century Polish people